The Diocese of Ribe (Danish: Ribe Stift) is a diocese within the Church of Denmark. Ribe Cathedral serves as the central cathedral within the diocese. Since 2014, the bishop has been Elof Westergaard.

The former Roman Catholic Diocese of Ribe was formed in 948 and oversaw much of southern Jutland. During the Protestant Reformation, the diocese converted to Lutheranism alongside the formation of the Church of Denmark. Thus, the diocese in its current form was established in 1536.

As of 2020, the diocese oversees 219 individual churches in 200 sogns, which are divided among 8 deaneries. The diocese covers a region with a population of 355,839, of which 295,860 are members of the church.

List of Bishops 
Johann Wenth, 1537–1541
Hans Tausen, 1541–1561
Poul Madsen, 1562–1569
Hans Laugesen, 1569–1594
Peder Jensen Hegelund, 1595–1614
Iver Iversen, 1614–1629
Jens Dinesen Jersin, 1629–1634
Hans Borchardsen, 1635–1643
Erik Monrad, 1643–1650
Peder Jensen Kragelund, 1650–1681
Christen Jensen Lodberg, 1681–1693
Ancher Anchersen, 1693–1701
Christian Muus, 1701–1712
Johannes Ocksen, 1712–1713
Laurids Thura, 1713–1731
Matthias Anchersen, 1731–1741
Hans Adolph Brorson, 1741–1764
Jørgen Bloch Carstens, 1764–1773
Eiler Eilersen Hagerup, 1773–1774
Tønne Bloch, 1774–1786
Stephan Middelboe, 1786–1811
Victor Christian Hjort, 1811–1818
Stephan Tetens, 1819
Jens Michael Hertz, 1819–1825
Conrad Daniel Koefoed, 1825–1831
Nicolai Fogtmann, 1831–1833 
Tage Christian Müller, 1833–1849
Jacob Brøgger Daugaard, 1850–1867
Carl Frederik Balslev, 1867–1895
Carl Viggo Gøtzche, 1895–1901
Peter Gabriel Koch, 1901–1922
Oluf Peter Kirstein Vogn Olesen, 1923–1930
Søren Westergaard Mejsen, 1930–1939
Carl Immanuel Scharling, 1939–1949
Morten Christian Lindegaard, 1949–1956
Henrik Dons Christensen, 1956–1980
Helge Skov, 1980–1991
Niels Holm, 1991–2003
Elisabeth Dons Christensen, 2003–2014
Elof Westergaard, 2014–present

References

External links 

Church of Denmark dioceses
Diocese Of Ribe
1536 establishments in Denmark